The Blacktown Workers Rugby League Football Club, also known as Blacktown Workers Sea Eagles, are an Australian rugby league football club based in Blacktown, New South Wales formed in 1962. Since 2017 they have had a side in the NSW Cup, as the feeder team to the Manly Warringah Sea Eagles.

Knock-on Effect NSW Cup

The Blacktown Workers Sea Eagles first season in The Intrust Super Premiership NSW was a disappointing one at they finished the season in 10th place and missed out on the finals series.

In 2018, the Blacktown Workers Sea Eagles missed out on the finals for a second consecutive season after finishing 9th on the table.
At the end of the 2019 Canterbury Cup NSW season, the Blacktown Workers Sea Eagles endured a tough season finishing last on the table and claiming the wooden spoon with just six wins all year.  The Ron Massey Cup side also had a tough season finishing 9th on the table and missing out on the finals.
In the 2022 NSW Cup season, Blacktown Workers finished last on the table and claimed the wooden spoon after winning only two matches for the entire year. The 2022 Ron Massey Cup side also had a poor year finishing second last on the table.

Notable Juniors 
John Klein (1974–76 Penrith Panthers)
Gary Allsop (1975–78 Penrith Panthers)
Wayne Moore (1972–75) Penrith Panthers however graded in 1973 from Blacktown Leagues
Peter Newsome (1975–77 Penrith Panthers) however graded in 1973 from Blacktown Leagues
Brad Izzard (1982–92 Penrith Panthers)
Craig Izzard (1983–93 Penrith Panthers, Parramatta Eels, Balmain Tigers & Illawarra Steelers)
Robbie Robards (1985–88 Penrith Panthers)
Grant Izzard (1990–93 Penrith Panthers & Illawarra Steelers)
Ben Galea (1999–13 Balmain Tigers, Wests Tigers, Hull Kingston Rovers & Hull F.C.)
Geoff Daniela (2007–2013 Penrith Panthers & Wests Tigers)
Brian To'o (2019– Penrith Panthers)

Honours
Sydney Shield Minor Premiers:
 2013

Ron Massey Cup
Blacktown competeted in the NSWRL Second Division and Matropolitan Cup in the late 1960s and early 1970s. Blacktown Workers entered the competition now known as the Ron Massey Cup in 2012.
The win–loss–draw record in the table below includes Finals Series matches.

Sydney Shield

See also

National Rugby League reserves affiliations
List of rugby league clubs in Australia
Rugby league in New South Wales

Sources

References

External links

Rugby league teams in Sydney
Rugby clubs established in 1962
1962 establishments in Australia
New South Wales Cup
Ron Massey Cup
Blacktown